The Elizabeth Longford Prize for Historical Biography was established in 2003 in memory of Elizabeth Longford (1906-2002), the British author, biographer and historian. The £5,000 prize is awarded annually for a historical biography published in the preceding year. 

The Elizabeth Longford Prize is sponsored by Flora Fraser and Peter Soros and administered by the Society of Authors.

Winners

2020s 
2022

 Winner: Andrew Roberts for George III: The Life and Reign of Britain’s Most Misunderstood Monarch (Allen Lane)

Shortlist:

 Timothy Brennan for Places of Mind, A Life of Edward Said (Bloomsbury)
 Helen Carr for The Red Prince: The Life of John of Gaunt, the Duke of Lancaster (Oneworld Publications)
 Jonathan Petropoulos for Göring's Man in Paris: The Story of A Nazi Art Plunderer and His World (Yale University Press)
 Jane Ridley for George V: Never a Dull Moment (Chatto & Windus)

2021

 Winner: Fredrik Logevall for JFK: Vol 1 (Penguin Books)

Shortlist:

 Sudhir Hazareesingh for Black Spartacus: The Epic Life of Toussaint Louverture (Allen King)
 Sarah LeFanu for Something of Themselves: Kipling, Kingsley, Conan Doyle and the Anglo-Boer War (Hurst)
 Samanth Subramanian for A Dominant Character: The Radical Science and Restless Politics of J.B.S Haldane (Atlantic)

2020

 Winner: D W. Hayton for Conservative Revolutionary: The Lives of Lewis Namier

Shortlist:

 Andrew S. Curran for Diderot and the Art of Thinking Freely
 Richard J. Evans for Eric Hobsbawm: A Life in History 
 Oliver Soden for Michael Tippett: The Biography
 A. N. Wilson for Prince Albert: The Man Who Saved the Monarchy

2010s
2019
 Winner: Julian Jackson for A Certain Idea of France: The Life of Charles de Gaulle
Shortlist:
 Diarmaid MacCulloch for Thomas Cromwell: A Life
 Andrew Roberts for Churchill: Walking with Destiny
 Jeffrey C. Stewart for The New Negro: The Life of Alain Locke

2018 
 Giles Tremlett for Isabella of Castile: Europe's First Great Queen
2017 
 John Bew for Citizen Clem: A Biography of Attlee
2016 
 Andrew Gailey for The Lost Imperialist: Lord Dufferin, Memory and Mythmaking in an Age of Celebrity
2015 
 Ben Macintyre for A Spy Among Friends: Kim Philby and the Great Betrayal
2014 
 Charles Moore for Margaret Thatcher: The Authorized Biography. Volume 1
2013 
 Anne Somerset for Queen Anne: The Politics of Passion
2012 
 Frances Wilson for How to Survive the Titanic or The Sinking of J. Bruce Ismay
2011 
 Philip Ziegler for Edward Heath (bio of Edward Heath)
2010 
 Tristram Hunt for The Frock-Coated Communist - The Revolutionary Life of Friedrich Engels

2000s
2009 
 Mark Bostridge for Florence Nightingale. The Woman and Her Legend
2008 
 Rosemary Hill for God's Architect: Pugin and the Building of Romantic Britain
2007 
 Jessie Childs for Henry VIII's Last Victim: The Life and Times of Henry Howard, Earl of Surrey
2006 
 Charles Williams for Petain: How the Hero of France Became a Convicted Traitor and Changed the Course of History 
2005 
 Ian Kershaw for Making Friends with Hitler: Lord Londonderry, the Nazis, and the Road to War' 
2004 
 Katie Whitaker for Mad Madge: Margaret Cavendish, Duchess of Newcastle, Royalist, Writer and Romantic 
2003 
 David Gilmour for The Long Recessional: The Imperial Life of Rudyard Kipling''

References

External links
 Elizabeth Longford Prize at the Society of Authors
 Elizabeth Longford Prize at lovethebook
 Elizabeth Longford Prize for Historical Biography Winners at Goodreads

Society of Authors awards
Biography awards
Awards established in 2003
2003 establishments in the United Kingdom